Malayotyphlops ruficauda, commonly known as brown blind snake or red-headed worm snake, is a species of snake in the Typhlopidae family. It is endemic to the Philippines, where it is found on the islands of Luzon, Tablas and Marinduque.

References

ruficauda
Endemic fauna of the Philippines
Reptiles of the Philippines
Reptiles described in 1845
Taxa named by John Edward Gray